The 1917 Washington football team was an American football team that represented the University of Washington during the 1917 college football season. Ernest Murphy was the team captain.

The defeat at California was Washington's first loss since 1907, ending a 63-game undefeated run (59 wins and 4 ties).

The Thanksgiving Day loss to Washington State at University Field (later Denny Field) was the first home defeat in a decade.

Schedule

 One game was played on Thursday (against Washington State on Thanksgiving)

References

External links
Game program: Washington State at Washington – November 29, 1917

Washington
Washington Huskies football seasons
Washington football